Colyford railway station, and its successor the Colyford tram stop, serve the village of Colyford in Devon, England. It was open as a railway station, on the Seaton branch line, between 1868 and 1966, and has been open as a tram stop, on the Seaton Tramway, since 1971. It is located on the eastern side of the village of Colyford, adjacent to the White Hart Inn, where the line crosses the A3052 road on a level crossing.

History
The Seaton and Beer Railway was authorised on 13 July 1863 for a line from a junction with the London and South Western Railway (L&SWR), at the station that was then known as Colyton for Seaton (but which later became Seaton Junction), to Seaton. The line was opened on 16 March 1868, together with its three stations including that at Colyford. The Seaton & Beer Railway was taken over by the L&SWR in 1885, and the L&SWR was incorporated into the Southern Railway with the Railway Grouping of 1923. The line and station became part of British Rail in 1948, but closed on 7 March 1966.

Meanwhile, Claude Lane, and his company Modern Electric Tramways, had been operating a  gauge tramway in the town of Eastbourne since 1953, but by the mid-1960s the growth of the town's road system began to threaten the tramway and Claude Lane began to look for a new site. He made approaches to the British Rail Board, and the line between Colyton station and a point to the north of Seaton station was transferred in 1969. Colyford remained the northern terminus of the line until 1980, when the line was extended to Colyton, making Colyford an intermediate stop.

Operation
The tram stop has a passing loop, with surfaced low-level platforms on either side, together with a siding sometimes used by the line's works cars. There is a waiting shelter on the southbound platform. The railway station's original gentlemen's lavatory is still in its original position, but is no longer in use. None of the other buildings of the railway station survive, although remnants of the original high platforms remain in places.

The line operates a daily service between Easter and the end of October. Services operate every 20 minutes between April and September, and every 30 minutes outside that period. All services stop at Colyford in both directions.

References

Citations

Bibliography

Beeching closures in England
Former London and South Western Railway stations
Railway stations in Devon
Railway stations in Great Britain opened in 1868
Railway stations in Great Britain closed in 1966
Tram stops in England